Tiago Lima Leal (born 26 March 1986), commonly known as Tiago Azulão, is a Brazilian professional footballer who plays as a forward for Angolan club Petro Luanda.
He earned his nickname, "Azulão", after wearing all blue clothes to play football when he was ten.

Career
In 2016, Tiago Azulão signed in with Petro de Luanda for two seasons at the end of which one more season was renewed. In 2017, he received an invitation to play for the Angola national team, but he was never called up.

Career statistics

Club

Notes

Honours
Petro Atlético
Angola Cup: 2017

Individual
Girabola top scorer: 2017, 2018, 2021
CAF Champions League Top Goalscorer: 2021–22

References

1988 births
Living people
Brazilian footballers
Brazilian expatriate footballers
Association football forwards
Tombense Futebol Clube players
Guarani Esporte Clube (MG) players
Clube Atlético Tricordiano players
Uberlândia Esporte Clube players
Oeste Futebol Clube players
Johor Darul Ta'zim F.C. players
Boa Esporte Clube players
Madureira Esporte Clube players
Clube de Regatas Brasil players
Villa Nova Atlético Clube players
Associação Atlética Caldense players
Fortaleza Esporte Clube players
Atlético Petróleos de Luanda players
TFF First League players
Campeonato Brasileiro Série B players
Campeonato Brasileiro Série C players
Campeonato Brasileiro Série D players
Malaysia Super League players
Girabola players
Brazilian expatriate sportspeople in Turkey
Expatriate footballers in Turkey
Brazilian expatriate sportspeople in Malaysia
Expatriate footballers in Malaysia
Brazilian expatriate sportspeople in Angola
Expatriate footballers in Angola
Olympiakos Nicosia players
Footballers from São Paulo